The Trud Stadium is a multi-purpose stadium in Podolsk, Russia. It is currently used mostly for football matches and was the main home ground of FC Vityaz Podolsk from 2009 to present time, FC Avangard Podolsk in 2009  PFC CSKA Moscow in 2014 due to disqualification of Arena Khimki for single match of the Russian Cup. and women's football club Podolchanka. The stadium holds 11,962.

References

External links

Football venues in Russia
Multi-purpose stadiums in Russia
Sports venues in Moscow Oblast